This is a list of post-secondary colleges and universities that have club football teams. Operating independently of their colleges' athletics programs, these teams are typically administered, coached, and played by students. In addition to playing other club teams, they play against institution-supported football programs at the college, community college, and collegiate prep school level. The vast majority of such schools are in the NCAA. Several teams in the club football circuits are from colleges that belong to the NJCAA, the equivalent sanctioning body for two-year institutions; four club teams in Canada belong to U Sports, which governs Canadian university athletics; and there is at least one independent amateur squad, the Southwestern Connecticut Grizzlies, that plays in a collegiate club football circuit.

Current club football teams

NCAA members
Boston University (main: Boston University Terriers football)
Central Connecticut State University
Clarkson University
Columbus State University
Coppin State University
Eastern Connecticut State University
Eastern Michigan University
University of Fort Lauderdale
George Mason University
Johnson & Wales College
Longwood University
Loyola University Chicago
Michigan State University
Middle Georgia State College
Metropolitan State College of Denver
Miami University of Ohio
Ohio State University
Princeton University (launched 2016)
Sacred Heart University
Southern Illinois University - Edwardsville
University of Florida
University of Michigan–Flint
University of North Carolina - Chapel Hill
University of North Carolina–Greensboro
University of Pittsburgh
University of South Carolina
University of Vermont (main: Vermont Catamounts football)
University of Wisconsin - Milwaukee (main: Milwaukee Panthers football)
Wright State University

NJCAA members
Onondaga Community College
Housatonic Community College

U Sports members
Dalhousie University
University of New Brunswick (separate teams for Fredericton and Saint John campuses)

CCAA members
Holland College

Former club football teams
Appalachian State University
Chattahoochee Technical College
Clemson University
Cleveland State University
DePaul University
Duke University
Kennesaw State University
King College
Lake Erie College*
Loyola Marymount University
Manhattan College
Marquette University
University of New Orleans
New York University
Old Dominion University
Orangeburg-Calhoun Technical College
North Carolina State University
Providence College
Queens College, City University of New York
Radford University
Rollins College
St. Bonaventure University
St. Francis College
Texas Tech University
University of California, San Diego
University of Maine
University of Maryland Eastern Shore
University of New Orleans
University of Texas at Arlington
University of Wisconsin–Parkside
Virginia Commonwealth University
Xavier University (main: Xavier Musketeers football)

Former club football teams that upgraded to NCAA level
Active programs
University at Albany
Alderson Broaddus University
Duquesne University
Fordham University
Gallaudet University 
Georgetown University 
Georgia Southern University
Georgia State University 
Marist College
Nicholls State University
Post University
University of San Diego
University of South Alabama
Inactive programs
Brooklyn College
Fairfield University
Iona College 
St. John's University 
St. Paul's College, Virginia 
Seton Hall University 
Siena College

See also
Collegiate club sports
List of NCAA Division I Institutions
List of NCAA Division II Institutions
List of NCAA Division III Institutions
List of NCAA Division I FBS football programs
List of NCAA Division I FCS football programs
List of NCAA Division II football programs
List of NCAA Division III football programs
List of NAIA football programs
List of community college football programs
List of Division I schools that have never sponsored football
List of defunct college football teams
National Club Football Association
Yankee Conference#Modern club football conference
Atlantic Football League

References

External links
National Club Football Association
Intercollegiate Club Football Federation
Yankee Collegiate Football Conference
Atlantic Football League (club football in eastern Canada)

Club
Club football
NCAA lists